Harrison Township is one of the twenty-two townships of Knox County, Ohio, United States.  The 2010 census found 806 people in the township.

Geography
Located in the east central part of the county, it borders the following townships:
Howard Township - north
Union Township - northeast corner
Butler Township - east
Jackson Township - southeast corner
Clay Township - south
Morgan Township - southwest corner
Pleasant Township - west, south of College Township
College Township - northwest, between Pleasant and Monroe Townships
Monroe Township - northwest corner, north of College Township

No municipalities are located in Harrison Township.

Name and history
Harrison Township was organized in 1825. It is named for William Henry Harrison.

It is one of nineteen Harrison Townships statewide.

Government
The township is governed by a three-member board of trustees, who are elected in November of odd-numbered years to a four-year term beginning on the following January 1. Two are elected in the year after the presidential election and one is elected in the year before it. There is also an elected township fiscal officer, who serves a four-year term beginning on April 1 of the year after the election, which is held in November of the year before the presidential election. Vacancies in the fiscal officership or on the board of trustees are filled by the remaining trustees.

References

External links
County website

Townships in Knox County, Ohio
Townships in Ohio